M. E. Church may refer to 
Maureen Elizabeth Church, Welsh botanist and botanical illustrator
Methodist Episcopal Church